COSCO operates one of the largest civil fleets in the world, currently (2017) consisting of 1,114 ships.

Container ships
Operated by COSCO SHIPPING Lines Co., Ltd.

Post-Panamax

Panamax

Sub-Panamax

Handysize

Other

Bulk carriers
Operated by COSCO Bulk Shipping (Group) Co., Ltd.

Capesize

Panamax

Handysize

Tankers
Operated by Dalian Ocean Shipping Company.

VLCC

Suezmax

Aframax

Panamax

Handysize

LPG carrier

LNG carrier

General cargo

Specialised vessels
Operated by COSCO SHIPPING Specialized Carriers Co. Ltd

Semi-submersibles

Heavy lift

Multi-purpose

Log carrier

Asphalt

Ro-Ro cargo

Passenger/cargo liners

References

Sources

 
Ship names